Polessky (masculine), Polesskaya (feminine), or Polesskoye (neuter) may refer to:
Polessky District, a district of Kaliningrad Oblast, Russia
Polesskoye Urban Settlement, a municipal formation which the town of district significance of Polessk in Polessky District of Kaliningrad Oblast, Russia is incorporated as
Poliske (Polesskoye), an abandoned town in Kyiv Oblast, Ukraine
Poliske, Narodychi Raion, an abandoned village in Zhytomyr Oblast, Ukraine
Poliske, Korosten Raion, a village in Zhytomyr Oblast, Ukraine